VfL Wolfsburg only just saved the contract to stay in Bundesliga, for the second year running. In sharp contrast to the miserable league season, Wolfsburg reached the semi finals of the DFB-Pokal, where they went out in a narrow defeat to eventual league champions Stuttgart.

Players

First-team squad

Left club during season

Results

Bundesliga

Top Scorers
  Mike Hanke 8
  Diego Klimowicz 7
  Alexander Madlung 5
  Marcelinho 4

Sources
  BetExplorer - German Bundesliga Results

Notes

VfL Wolfsburg seasons
Wolfsburg